Gabriela Campagnoli Rocha (born May 20, 1995 in Vitória) is a Brazilian competitive swimmer.

At 16 years old, integrating Brazilian national delegation that disputed the 2011 Pan American Games in Guadalajara, she won the silver medal in 4×200-metre freestyle by participating at heats. She also finished 12th in the 800-metre freestyle.

References

1995 births
Living people
People from Vitória, Espírito Santo
Brazilian female freestyle swimmers
Swimmers at the 2011 Pan American Games
Pan American Games silver medalists for Brazil
Pan American Games medalists in swimming
Medalists at the 2011 Pan American Games
Sportspeople from Espírito Santo
21st-century Brazilian women